In the City of Angels is the fifth solo album by Yes lead singer Jon Anderson, released in 1988.

Unlike most of Anderson's previous solo works, this album contains many additional songwriters. Consequently, it is the most straight-ahead commercial pop album in his oeuvre. Members of the band Toto perform on several songs. Jon reciprocated the favor by performing on their album The Seventh One (recorded about the same time as In the City of Angels).

Two songs from the album ("Hold on to Love" and "In a Lifetime") were co-written by Lamont Dozier, of Motown records.

A music video for "Hold on to Love" aired on TV. In the video, the album is titled In the City of Lost Angels. Chris Squire has a cameo appearance in the video as acoustic bass player.

Track listing

Personnel 
 Jon Anderson - Vocals, Harp, Drums, Percussion
 Steve Lukather - Guitar (Track 10)
 Steve Porcaro - Keyboard programming (Track 10)
 Jeff Porcaro - Drums (Track 2, 4 & 10)
 Mike Porcaro - Bass (Tracks 2 & 4)
 David Paich - Keyboards, Orchestration (Tracks 2, 4, 6 & 10)
 Joseph Williams - Backing vocals (Track 10)
 Larry Williams - Keyboards, Programming (Tracks 1, 3, 5 & 9)
 John Robinson - Drums (Tracks 1, 3, 7–9)
 Paul Jackson Jr. - Guitar (Tracks 1 & 5)
 Jimmy Haslip - Bass (Track 1, 5, 7 & 8)
 Lenny Castro - Percussion (Tracks 1, 3, 5 & 7)
 Dann Huff - Guitar (Tracks 2, 4 & 8)
 Michael Landau - Guitar (Tracks 2, 4, 7-9 & 11)
 Marc Russo - Saxophone (Track 4)
 Paulinho Da Costa - percussion (Tracks 4 & 8)
 Gordon Peeke - Drum programming (Track 7)
 Don Freeman - Keyboards (Tracks 7 & 8)
 Jerry Hey - Trumpet (Track 7)
 Gary Grant - Trumpet (Track 7)
 Bill Reichenbach Jr. - Sax, Trombone (Tracks 7 & 9)
 Kim Hutchcroft - Sax (Track 7)
 Rhett Lawrence - Keyboards, Programming (Tracks 9 & 11)
 The Cathedral Choir - Backing vocals (Track 11)

Reception
Paul Robicheau of The Boston Globe wrote a mixed review, referring to the album as "Jon goes to Hollywood". He criticized Anderson's "smarmy lyrics" and the album's commercial production, likening the album's sound to Toto.
Robicheau singled out the track "Hold On To Love" as having a "perky appeal" and noted the "interesting rhythm" on "Sundancing". Robicheau concluded his review by writing "this is a record you can both love and hate."

Charts

References

1988 albums
Jon Anderson albums
Albums produced by Stewart Levine
Columbia Records albums